José António Branco (born 5 October 1959) is a Portuguese judoka. He competed in the men's half-lightweight event at the 1980 Summer Olympics.

References

1959 births
Living people
Portuguese male judoka
Olympic judoka of Portugal
Judoka at the 1980 Summer Olympics
Place of birth missing (living people)